Pražského povstání is a Prague Metro station on Line C. It is located below Náměstí Hrdinů in the neighbourhood of Pankrác (part of Nusle). The station was opened on 9 May 1974 with the first section of Prague Metro, between Sokolovská and Kačerov.

The station is a sub-surface type with a straight ceiling and depth of the platform  under ground level. Its name literally means [station of the] Prague Uprising.

References

Prague Metro stations
Railway stations opened in 1974
1974 establishments in Czechoslovakia
Railway stations in the Czech Republic opened in the 20th century